Kinder Scout is a moorland plateau and national nature reserve in the Dark Peak of the Derbyshire Peak District in England. In excellent weather conditions, the city of Manchester and the Greater Manchester conurbation can be seen from the western edges, as well as Winter Hill near Bolton and the mountains of Snowdonia in North Wales.

To the north, across the Snake Pass, lie the high moors of Bleaklow and Black Hill, which are of similar elevation.

Kinder Scout featured on the BBC television programme Seven Natural Wonders (2005) as one of the wonders of the Midlands; however, it is considered by many to be in Northern England, lying between the cities of Manchester and Sheffield. In chronostratigraphy, the British sub-stage of the Carboniferous period, the Kinderscoutian, derives its name from Kinder Scout.

Etymology
The name "Kinder" was first recorded in the Domesday Survey of 1086 as Chendre, and is of obscure meaning. It is believed to be pre-English in origin. "Scout" is an old word for a high, overhanging rock (derived from the Norse skúte), and refers to the cliffs on the western side of the plateau.

Public access
Kinder Scout is accessible from the villages of Hayfield and Edale in the High Peak of Derbyshire. It is a popular hiking location and the Pennine Way crosses Kinder Scout and the moors to the north. This has resulted in the erosion of the underlying peat, prompting work by Derbyshire County Council and the Peak District National Park Authority to repair it, in conjunction with the landowner, the National Trust. The Four Inns Walk, a competitive hiking event crosses over Kinder Scout.

The plateau was the location of the mass trespass in 1932. From the National Park's inception, a large area of the high moorland north of Edale was designated as 'Open Country'. In 2003, the "right to roam" on uncultivated land was enshrined into law, and this area of open country has been significantly extended.

Parts of the Kinder Scout plateau (except legal rights of way) are still occasionally closed for conservation, public safety, grouse shooting or fire prevention reasons, but prior notice is generally given on the Peak District National Park Authority's website.

Landmarks

Kinder Downfall

Kinder Downfall is the tallest waterfall in the Peak District, with a 30-metre fall. It lies on the River Kinder, where it flows west over one of the gritstone cliffs on the plateau edge. Although usually little more than a trickle in summer, in spate conditions it is impressive. In certain wind conditions (notably when there is a strong westerly wind), the water is blown back on itself, and the resulting cloud of spray can be seen from several miles away. In cold winters the waterfall freezes providing local mountaineers with an icy challenge that can be climbed with ice axes, ropes and crampons. Below the Downfall the River Kinder flows into Kinder Reservoir.

The gritstone edges
Some of Kinder's many gritstone cliffs were featured in the first rock-climbing guide to the Peak District, Some Gritstone Climbs, published in 1913 and written by John Laycock.

Edale Cross

The Edale Cross lies immediately south of Kinder Scout, under Kinder Low and on the former Hayfield to Edale road. It marks the former junction of the three wards of the Forest of Peak: Glossop and Longdendale, Hopedale and Campagna. The first cross on the site may have been set up by the Abbots of Basingwerk Abbey to mark the southern boundary of their land, granted in 1157. The date of the current cross is unknown, although an adjoining plaque and its listing as a Scheduled Monument date it to the mediaeval period. At some point it fell down, and was re-erected in 1810, when the date and initials JG, WD, GH, JH and JS were carved into it. These stand for John Gee, William Drinkwater, George and Joseph Hadfield and John Shirt, local farmers of the day who raised the cross.

Mermaid's Pool

Mermaid's Pool, a small pool below Kinder Downfall, is said, according to legend, to be inhabited by a mermaid who will grant immortality upon whoever sees her on Easter Eve.

Kinder Low
Surmounted by a trig point and with steep slopes to south and west it is often mistaken as the highest point. The true summit, which is  higher, is an unmarked point on the flat plateau  to the north east. Low is an old dialect word meaning 'hill top'.

Kinderlow bowl barrow
A bowl barrow, thought to be unexcavated and to date from the Bronze Age, stands on Kinder Low, a western projection of the main massif above Hayfield.

View
Major English and Welsh peaks visible (in ideal conditions) from Kinder Scout include (clockwise from west) Winter Hill, Pendle Hill, Ingleborough, Whernside, Pen-y-ghent, Fountains Fell, Buckden Pike, Great Whernside, Bleaklow, Margery Hill, the Weaver Hills, Axe Edge, The Roaches, Shutlingsloe, Shining Tor, the Long Mynd, Stiperstones, Corndon Hill, Cilfaesty Hill, Moel y Golfa, Plynlimon, Cadair Berwyn, Beeston Castle, Alderley Edge, Arenig Fawr, Moel Famau, Snowdon, Glyder Fach, Tryfan, Y Garn, Carnedd Llewelyn and Foel-fras.

Tone poem
The orchestral sketch Kinder Scout was composed by Patrick Hadley, written for the Buxton Spa Orchestra and its occasional director George Cathie. It was first performed in Buxton in September 1923. Hadley had an emotional attachment to the Derbyshire peaks, which are also celebrated in his later cantata The Hills (1943).<ref>[https://www.chandos.net/chanimages/Booklets/CH10981.pdf Foreman, Lewis. Notes to British Tone Poems, Volume 2, Chandos Records (2019)]</ref>

See also
 Pennines
 Rambling

References

Bibliography

Picture gallery

External links

 Kinder Scout Computer-generated summit panoramas. Note: the panorama shown is not all visible from the summit. There is a large summit plateau; to see the entire panorama shown, it is necessary to walk around the summit but nearer the perimeter of the plateau.

Mountains and hills of Derbyshire
Plateaus of England
Marilyns of England
Hewitts of England
Mountains and hills of the Peak District
Nuttalls
National nature reserves in England
Highest points of English counties
Moorlands of England
High Peak, Derbyshire